Medvék RK is a Hungarian rugby club in Budapest. They currently play in Nemzeti Bajnokság II.

History
The club was founded in 2003.

Current squad

External links
  Medvék RK

Hungarian rugby union teams
Rugby clubs established in 2003